Syabry ( – Friends) is a Belarus pop group, established in 1974.

The first victory – the first place in the first national contest entertainers 1974 in Minsk. In the summer of 1975, the management team was invited .

The ensemble was included in the plans of Rosconcert actively toured over the USSR. Performs songs of Russian and Belarusian authors. Most of the songs were written for the ensemble of the Belarusian composer and musical director of the ensemble, .

Discography 
 The Best (1995)
 Grand Collection (2004)
 Grand Collection (2009)

References

External links 
 Official website
 The band's songs Syabry
 Ensemble Syabry  – official website of the Belarusian State Philharmonic

Musical groups established in 1974
Belarusian folk music groups
Belarusian pop music groups
Soviet vocal-instrumental ensembles
Belarusian musical groups